The Arthur Highway (A9) is a Tasmanian highway which runs from Sorell in the near south to Port Arthur in the far south-east.

Route description
From its intersection with the Tasman Highway in Sorell the highway runs east, crossing Iron Creek before turning south-east to Forcett. From there it continues in an easterly direction, crossing the Carlton River, to Copping, where it turns south to Dunalley. Here it crosses the Denison Canal via a swing bridge to the Forestier Peninsula, before continuing south-east to Eaglehawk Neck, the entry to the Tasman Peninsula. After following the southern shore of Eaglehawk Bay to the west the highway turns south and continues in that direction to Port Arthur where it transitions to route B37 (Nubeena Road).

History
Port Arthur (the town) was named for George Arthur, the lieutenant governor of Van Diemen’s Land. It is likely that the name of the highway was derived from this source.

The first "proper" crossing of the Carlton River, near the line now followed by the highway, was opened in 1883. It consisted of multiple wooden bridges and causeways. 
Work commenced on a concrete bridge, a replacement for all three wooden bridges on a slightly altered alignment, in 1944.

The Denison Canal opened in 1905 with a wooden, manually operated swing bridge. This was replaced by an electrically operated bridge in 1965.

Major intersections

See also

 Highways in Australia
 List of highways in Tasmania

References

Highways in Tasmania
South East Tasmania